Kotli Rai Abu Bakar is a Village and Union Council NO.25 of Kasur District in the Punjab province of Pakistan. It is Major Village and Union Council  of Kasur Tehsil, and is located at 31°6'1N 74°16'42E with an altitude of 188 metres (620 feet).

References

Kasur District